Cadieux  is a surname. Notable persons with that surname include:

Anne-Marie Cadieux (born 1963), Canadian actress, film director and screenwriter
Chester Cadieux, co-founder of QuikTrip, a US chain of convenience stores
David Cadieux (born 1974), professional heavyweight boxer from Canada
Geneviève Cadieux (born 1955), Canadian artist
Jason Cadieux, Canadian film, television and stage actor
Léo Cadieux, PC OC (1908–2005), Canadian politician
Lorenzo Cadieux, SJ (1903–1976), Canadian Jesuit priest, historian and academic
Marcel Cadieux, CC (1915–1981), Canadian civil servant and diplomat
Paul Cadieux, Canadian film and television producer
Paul-André Cadieux (born 1947), professional ice hockey forward, coach, sports director
Pierre Cadieux, PC (born 1948), lawyer and former Canadian politician
Ray Cadieux (born 1941), ice hockey player
Sophie Cadieux (born 1977), Quebec actress
Stephanie Cadieux (born 1972), Canadian politician
Sylvain Cadieux (born 1974), Canadian archer
Teri MacDonald-Cadieux (born 1963), Canadian stock car racing driver

See also
L'Île-Cadieux, Quebec, village and municipality in the Montérégie region of Quebec, Canada
It's Your Turn, Laura Cadieux, Canadian comedy film